Gordon Jamison Davis is an American lawyer and civic leader. He was born in Chicago in 1941 and has been a resident of New York City since his graduation from Harvard Law School in 1967, and has been a prominent leader in New York City's public, civic, and legal affairs for four decades. He was Mayor Ed Koch's first New York City Parks Commissioner and is considered New York's most successful parks commissioner since the Robert Moses era. Since 2012, Davis has been a partner in the New York office of the law firm Venable LLP.

Davis was one of the first African Americans to become a partner in a major New York corporate law firm (Lord Day & Lord, 1983). He is the Founding Chairman of Jazz at Lincoln Center, one of the four Founding Trustees of the Central Park Conservancy, a Founding Member in the first class inducted into the Performing Arts Hall of Fame at Lincoln Center, a Life Trustee of the New York Public Library, an appointee of President Barack Obama to the board of the Kennedy Center for the Performing Arts, and a recipient of an honorary degree (LL.D.) and the Bicentennial Medal from his alma mater, Williams College.

Early life and education
Gordon J. Davis was born in Chicago on August 7, 1941, where he lived on the South Side in the Woodlawn/Englewood area and then in the Hyde Park-Kenwood neighborhood next to the University of Chicago. His parents were Dr. W. Allison Davis and Elizabeth Stubbs Davis, both Harvard and the University of London trained social anthropologists who collaborated on groundbreaking social-anthropological studies of caste and class in the American South in the 1930s and 1940s. Dr. Davis became the John Dewey Distinguished Professor of Education at the University of Chicago. Earlier, when the University granted Dr. Davis tenure in 1947, he became the first African American to be granted tenure status at any white institution of higher education—college or university, public or private—in the United States. A U.S. postage stamp commemorating Dr. Davis and his pioneering work in the social sciences and education of disadvantaged Americans was issued in 1994.

Davis attended the public Hyde Park High School and then the private Francis Parker School. He attended Williams College, where he graduated in 1963. At Williams, Davis was the vice president of the senior honor society Gargoyle and the co-founder and co-chair of the Williams Civil Rights Committee. The Davis Center at Williams College, established in 2012 to address issues of diversity and inclusion, was named for and commemorates the work of Gordon Davis's father and uncle, W. Allison Davis (Williams ’24) and John A. Davis (Williams ’33). In 2022, Williams established the Gordon J. Davis '63 Social and Racial Justice Fellowship.

Following graduate studies at Columbia University (1963-1964), Davis attended Harvard Law School, where he graduated in 1967. He was a founder of the Harvard Law School Black Law Students Association (the first BLSA chapter in the country). He was one of the earliest contributors to the newly established Harvard Civil Rights-Civil Liberties Law Review (Volume II of the Review (spring 1967); (See various later publications and comments in 1981, 1983, 2004, and 2015).

Career

Government and Public service
Beginning in the reform administration of New York Mayor John V. Lindsay in 1967, Davis's public service has spanned more than four decades, during which time he was a City official appointed by or an advisor to New York Mayors John V. Lindsay, Edward I. Koch, David Dinkins, and Michael Bloomberg. He was a special assistant to Mayor Lindsay and secretary of the Mayor's Cabinet. In 1973 Lindsay appointed Davis to be a commissioner of the seven-member New York City Planning Commission (during his city planning service Davis was affiliated with the law firm of Poletti Friedan Praskher Feldman). In January 1978 he was appointed by Mayor Edward Koch as Commissioner of Parks and Recreation. As Parks Commissioner from 1978 to spring 1983, Davis was widely credited with reviving and restoring New York's parks after the City's fiscal collapse, and is considered the most successful New York City parks commissioner since the Robert Moses era.

His many innovations as Parks Commissioner included the urban park rangers, borough decentralization, privatization of the city's 13 golf courses, the revival of Bryant Park through the Bryant Park Restoration Corporation, establishment of the Prospect Park administrator's office, and the founding of the Central Park Conservancy. Davis was recognized in 2020 by the New York Landmarks Conservancy as a Living Landmark for his outstanding contributions to the city.

Following the Koch administration, Davis was a key member of Mayor David Dinkins' transition committee and later served as chair of Mayor Michael Bloomberg's 2001-2002 criminal justice transition committee.

Private law practice
Since 2012, Davis has been a partner in the New York office of The American Lawyer 100 firm, Venable LLP. He first became a partner in a large New York firm when he joined Lord Day & Lord in April 1983. At the time, he was one of only five African Americans who were partners in a New York Wall Street–type corporate law firm. From 1994 to 2012 Mr. Davis was a partner at Leboeuf Lamb Green & McRae. In 2001 he took a leave of absence from Leboeuf to serve as president of Lincoln Center Inc. (Leboeuf Lamb became Dewey & Leboeuf after its merger with Dewey Ballantine 2007). Throughout his years in private practice in the areas of real estate development and not-for-profit institutions, Davis has represented a wide variety of highly regarded institutions in some of the most important public-private projects in New York City, including the New York Public Library, Lincoln Center for the Performing Arts, Mt. Sinai Medical Center, Amtrak, the Billie Jean King National Tennis Center and the United States Tennis Association, Jazz at Lincoln Center, the American Museum of Natural History, the Studio Museum in Harlem, and the 9/11 Memorial and Museum by the Lower Manhattan Development Corporation.

Davis has been recognized as one of New York's most accomplished lawyers and as one of the nation's top African American lawyers. Mr. Davis and Conrad Harper of Simpson Thatcher organized the concerted efforts of New York's African American law partners which led the New York Bar Association in the late 1980s to establish the Vance Committee to Enhance Professional Opportunities for Minorities (chaired by Cyrus Vance Sr. and composed of the leaders of New York's 35 major law firms).

Civic and Cultural Involvement 
Davis has been involved with a broad spectrum of civic, not-for-profit, and cultural organizations. He is one of the four Founding Trustees of the Central Park Conservancy including Elizabeth Barlow Rogers, William Sperry Beinecke and Richard Gilder. Davis and these three individuals, together with Mayor Koch, conceived and established the Conservancy in 1980–1982. The Conservancy has completely restored and rebuilt and now maintains the Olmsted and Vaux landmark Central Park. Davis is the Founding Chairman of Jazz at Lincoln Center (JALC). In 1989 he  joined renowned jazz musician and educator Wynton Marsalis, Lincoln Center chairman George Weisman and author Albert Murray, among others, to spearhead the founding of JALC. As chairman of JALC from its inception in 1989 until 2001, Davis "was a driving force in [JALC] becoming an independent constituent of Lincoln Center Inc., in July 1996, equal to each of the other performing arts on the Lincoln Center campus and also in the conception and construction of [JALC's] home Frederick P. Rose Hall, the 'House of Swing'."

Davis, who served as president of Lincoln Center in 2001, was selected in 2016 as a Founding Member of the Performing Arts Hall of Fame at Lincoln Center. He is a Life Trustee of the New York Public Library and was appointed in 2010 by President Barack Obama to serve a six-year term as a trustee of the Kennedy Center for the Performing Arts.

In addition, Davis continues to be an active board member of the Studio Museum in Harlem, the New York Public Theater/Shakespeare Festival, and as pro bono general counsel for the Aaron Diamond Aids Research Center (having served each institution in those capacities for over 20 years).

Corporate Boards 
Mr. Davis has served on the boards of a number of public companies, including Con Edison, Phoenix Home Life Inc., New York Magazine, Inc., and the Dreyfus Corporation. He continues to serve on the boards of two groups of BNY Mellon Dreyfus mutual funds.

Recognition
Mr. Davis holds honorary degrees from Williams College (Doctor of Laws) and Bard College (Doctor of Humane Letters). He is a recipient of the Williams College Bicentennial Medal, the Central Park Conservancy Frederick Law Olmsted Medal, and the Medal of the City of New York for Exceptional Service. He has also been honored by the New York 100 Black Men, the Harlem School of the Arts (Founders Medal), the Dance Theater of Harlem, The Citizens Committee for New York (Chapin Award for the Arts), New Yorkers for Parks, the Studio Museum in Harlem, and the Prospect Park Alliance. He is also a recipient of Jazz at Lincoln Center’s Ed Bradley Award for Leadership, and as noted previously, was designated in 2020 as a NYC Living Landmark.

Family 
Davis is married (1968) to Peggy Cooper Davis, a former New York State Family Court judge who is the John S. R. Shad Professor of Lawyering and Ethics at the New York University Law School. Professor Davis has published extensively on a wide interdisciplinary range of subjects, most notably the constitutional status of family rights. She is considered an important leader in innovation and changing law school pedagogy.

A 1968 graduate of Harvard Law School, Professor Davis was an editor of the Harvard Civil Rights-Civil Liberties Law Review and a founder of the Harvard Law School Black Law Student Association.

The Davises have a daughter, Elizabeth Cooper Davis, a performing artist and educator, NYU (M.A.); Harvard University (Ph.D.). Ms. Davis is an Assistant Professor - Applied Theater at Emerson College.

Davis' brother, Allison Stubbs Davis (b. August 31, 1939) lives in Chicago. He is a lawyer, real estate developer, and community planner.

References

Williams College alumni
African-American lawyers
Francis W. Parker School (Chicago) alumni
Harvard Law School alumni
Columbia University alumni
1941 births
Living people
New York City Department of Parks and Recreation
21st-century African-American people
20th-century African-American people